The 2011–12 Magyar Kupa (English: Hungarian Cup) was the 55th edition of the tournament.

Matches 
A total of  matches will take place, starting with Round 1 on 2 September 2011 and culminating with the final on 15 April 2012 at the Sportmax in Budapest.

Quarter-finals

|}

Final four
The final four will be held on 14 and 15 April 2012 at the Sportmax 2 Hegyvidék in Budapest.

Final

Final standings

See also
 2011–12 Nemzeti Bajnokság I

References

External links
 Hungarian Handball Federaration 

Magyar Kupa
Magyar Kupa